Gita Mehta (née Patnaik; born 1943) is an Indian writer and documentary filmmaker.

Biography
Born in Delhi into a well-known Odia family, she is the daughter of Biju Patnaik, an Indian independence activist and a Chief Minister in post-independence Odisha, then known as Orissa.  Her younger brother, Naveen Patnaik, has served as the Chief Minister of Odisha since 2000. She completed her education in India and at the University of Cambridge, United Kingdom. She was adjudged for India's fourth highest civilian award the Padma Shri in 2019, which she declined for political reasons.

She has produced and/or directed 14 television documentaries for UK, European and US networks.  During the years 1970–1971 she was a television war correspondent for the US television network NBC. Her film compilation of the Bangladesh revolution, Dateline Bangladesh, was shown in cinemas both in India and abroad.

She is the widow of Sonny Mehta, former head of the Alfred A. Knopf publishing house, whom she married in 1965. She has one son, Aditya Singh Mehta. Her books have been translated into 21 languages and been on the bestseller lists in Europe, the US and India. Her fiction and non-fiction focuses exclusively  on India - its culture and history - and on the Western perception of it. Her works reflect the insight gained through her journalistic and political background.

Mehta divides her time between New York City, London and New Delhi.

Works
 Karma Cola. Simon & Schuster, 1979.
 Raj, 1989
 A River Sutra (short stories), 1993
 Snakes and Ladders: Glimpses of Modern India, London: Secker & Warburg, 1997. 
 Eternal Ganesha: From Birth to Rebirth, Thames & Hudson, 2006

References

 Sharma, Bhasha Shukla. "Mapping culture through 'A river Sutra': Tribal myths, dialogism, and meta-narratives in postcolonial fiction", Universal Journal of Education and General Studies 1 (2), 17–27, 2012

External links
Gita Mehta at Penguin India

 Bio-bibliographical Information

1943 births
Living people
Indian women television journalists
Indian television journalists
Writers from Delhi
English-language writers from India
Alumni of the University of Cambridge
Indian documentary filmmakers
Indian women documentary filmmakers
Women artists from Delhi
Screenwriters from Delhi
Journalists from Delhi
Women writers from Delhi
20th-century Indian journalists
20th-century Indian women writers